Daniele Turani was a member of the Italian Christian Democracy, and was an Italian Senator from Lombardy. He died in office in 1964.

Political career
Turani obtained a seat in the Italian Senate after Piero Mentasti's retirement. He died in office after two re-elections.

See also
Italian Senate election in Lombardy, 1953

External links

Site

1907 births
1964 deaths
Members of the Italian Senate from Lombardy
Christian Democracy (Italy) politicians
20th-century Italian politicians
Members of the Senate of the Republic (Italy)